Staulen is an island in the municipality of Herøy in Nordland county, Norway. The  island just southwest of the large island of Dønna.  The settlements on the island include the villages of Nordstaulen, Sørstaulen, and Sandvikja.

The Åkviksundet (Åkvik Strait) lies between the islands of Staulen and Dønna and the Åkviksundet Bridge and Norwegian County Road 828 connect the two islands.  The road continues south through Staulen before crossing various smaller islands, including Landvindsøya, Skardsøya, and Kjeøya, before crossing the Hoholmen Bridge on its way to the island of Nord-Herøy.

See also
List of islands of Norway

References

External links
Staulen at Norgeskart.no

Islands of Nordland
Herøy, Nordland